Lijin (also Romanized as Lījīn; also known as Legīn, Lejen, Lejīn, and Lidzhim) is a village in Sina Rural District, in the Central District of Varzaqan County, East Azerbaijan Province, Iran. At the 2006 census, its population was 277, in 49 families.

References 

Towns and villages in Varzaqan County